Christian Marazzi (born: 1951) is a Swiss economist and author.

Biography 

He was born in Lugano, Switzerland in 1951.

Education  

He graduated in political science from the University of Padua.

He completed his master's degree in economics at the London School of Economics.

He completed his Ph.D. in economics at the City University of London.

Career 

He has held positions at the University of Lausanne, Padua, New York and Geneva, and is currently Professor and Research Director of Socio-Economics at the Scuola Universitaria della Svizzera Italiana.

Bibliography 

His notable books include:

 The Violence of Financial Capitalism

 Capital and Language: From the New Economy to the War Economy

 Capital and Affects: The Politics of the Language Economy

 Autonomia: Post Political Politics

References

External links 
 Biography 1
 Biography 2

Swiss writers
Swiss economists
1951 births
Living people